Whitehorn Mountain is a  peak located in eastern British Columbia, Canada near the Alberta border. It is one of British Columbia's 102 ultra prominent peaks.

Whitehorn Mountain was first climbed by Conrad Kain in a rare solo ascent for him. Kain was in the Mount Robson area guiding a reconnaissance party led by Arthur Wheeler in 1911 when he completed the solo ascent, much to the disgruntlement of Wheeler.


Climate
Based on the Köppen climate classification, Whitehorn Mountain is located in a subarctic climate zone with cold, snowy winters, and mild summers. Winter temperatures can drop below -20 °C with wind chill factors below -30 °C.

See also
 List of Ultras of North America

References

External links
 "Whitehorn Mountain, British Columbia" on Peakbagger

Three-thousanders of British Columbia
Canadian Rockies